White Palms is a 2006 Hungarian film directed by Szabolcs Hajdu. It was Hungary's submission to the 79th Academy Awards for the Academy Award for Best Foreign Language Film, but was not accepted as a nominee.

See also

List of submissions to the 79th Academy Awards for Best Foreign Language Film

References

External links

2000s Hungarian-language films
2006 films
2006 drama films
Gymnastics films
Hungarian drama films
Films directed by Szabolcs Hajdu